Babatunde O. Gbadamosi (born 15 October 1967), is a Nigerian businessman, real estate developer and politician.

Early life 
Gbadamosi was born on October 15, 1967 in England to the  family of the late Fatai Gbadamosi and Alhaja Jemilat Gbadamosi. Gbadamosi is first of the thirteen children of His late father, Fatai Gbadamosi. Gbadamosi's early life was reflective of the saying, “it takes a village to raise a child”.

Education 
Between 1972 and 1978, Gbadamosi Attended K. Kotun Memorial Nursery and Primary School, Surulere, Lagos. He Attended Government College Lagos, Eric Moore Road, Surulere, from 1978 To 1981 then moved to Government College Victoria Island and finished at Government College Ikorodu In 1985. He then attended the now defunct Lagos State School of Basic Studies, Agindingbi, Ikeja. Gbadamosi attended The Lagos State University (LASU) from 1986 to 1989.

Political career

In 1994, Gbadamosi joined the UK Branch of the National Conscience Party, which he represented in NADECO Forum (UK), a broad coalition of political groups and NGOs formed to help return Nigeria to democracy. As an active member of the forum, he helped organise the epochal Nigerian Democracy Week, culminating on June 12, 1995.

On his return to Nigeria in 2007, he supported the candidacy of PDP's Senator Musiliu Obanikoro for the Governorship of Lagos State, and formally joined the PDP 2008.

He contested for the party's nomination to run as candidate for Governor of Lagos State in 2011 and again In 2015. He joined the Action Democratic Party (ADP) in 2017, and won the party's primary election in October 2018. He was the ADP candidate in the 2019 Lagos State Gubernatorial election in which he was the second runner up. Gbadamosi rejoined the People's Democratic Party in March 2020.
On September 5, 2020, he was announced as the candidate for the People's Democratic party in the October 31, 2020, Lagos East Senatorial district Bye-election. The court fined him after he lost at the tribunal.

Business career 
On his arrival in the UK in 1990, Gbadamosi started out working in small retail and service businesses, worked at Royal Mail as a mailman for a while, then London Underground as a station assistant, and did a stint as a mini-cab driver, and then got bitten by the entrepreneurial bug. He started out with his own cab firm, went into recruitment, and then into IT recruitment and finally into IT Training, Consultancy and Certification.

2003 – 2021 Redbrick Homes International Ltd - Director

2000 – 2007	Esstech Ltd, T/A Esstech College – Director

1997 – 1999	Akorn Recruitment Ltd - Director

1995 – 1997	Chequers Cars Ltd - Director

1990 – 1993	Various retail/clerical jobs, including 7-11, Royal Mail & Top Rank Bingo

Associations 
Member Of EKO Club Lagos

NADECO Forum UK

Afenifere Group

Member of Government College Ikorodu Old Students Association

Member of Government College Lagos Old

Member of LASU Alumnus Association, United Kingdom

References 

Living people
Action Democratic Party (Nigeria) politicians
Nigerian businesspeople
1967 births